Acidicapsa acidisoli  is a gram-negative, aerobic and non-motile bacterium from the genus of Acidicapsa which has been isolated from acidic soil from a deciduous forest from the Mount Shirakami in Japan.

References

External links
Type strain of Acidicapsa acidisoli at BacDive -  the Bacterial Diversity Metadatabase

Acidobacteriota
Bacteria described in 2017